is a city in Nara Prefecture, Japan. , the city has an estimated population of 84,059 and 38,944 households.

Geography
Yamato Koriyama is located in the northern part of the Nara Basin and stretches approximately 9 km from east to west and 7 km from north to south covering an area about 42 square kilometers.

The majority of the city is flat, although to the west of the Tomio River it rises to the Yata hills.

In general, the city has a temperate climate and is classified as having an "inland climate":  a wide range of temperature bringing hot summers and cold winters, but heavy snows are rare, at most once a year.

There are 6 railway stations, (JR Koriyama, JR Yamatokoizumi, Kintetsu Koriyama, Kintetsu Kujo, Kintetsu Tsutsui, and Kintetsu Hirahata), and it takes about 40 minutes to travel to Osaka on the JR line and 45 minutes to Kyoto on the Kintetsu line. Nara is just one stop away on the JR line.

The city produces various agricultural, commercial, and factory products. For example, cultivation of rice and fresh vegetables such as strawberries and tomatoes is thriving.
A large shopping mall on the edge of the city and many large shopping centres in the suburbs are sustaining commercial industry. The  "Showa Kogyo Danchi," industrial zone, located in the southern part of the city is the largest in Nara Prefecture and employs a large number of workers. Recently, the numbers of laborers from Brazil and Asian countries such as Vietnam and Indonesia working there is on the increase.

Yamatokoriyama is well known for the cultivation of goldfish, a motif widely seen around the city. In the Koriyama Castle site area, the original stone wall has remained intact for nearly 400 years, and the castle draws large numbers of visitors to the "Oshiro Matsuri" festival, which is held every year in the spring when the cherry blossoms are in full bloom.

Neighboring municipalities

Yamatokōriyama adjoins the following municipalities.
 Nara
 Ikoma
 Tenri
 Ando
 Ikaruga
 Kawanishi

Notable locations

Koriyama Castle

Construction of the castle was started by the Sengoku daimyō Tsutsui Junkei. Toyotomi Hidenaga later made it his residence and it became the headquarters of the Kōriyama Domain in the Edo period. The castle was held at various times by members of the Mizuno, Okudaira Matsudaira, Honda, Fujii Matsudaira, and Yanagisawa clans.

Shrines
 Meta Shrine
 Yanagisawa Shrine
 Kasuga Shrine
 Koizumi Shrine

Temples
 Matsuo-dera
 Yata-dera
 Jikō-in
 Kyūshō-ji
 Kakuan-ji

Other
 Dainagon-zuka (grave of Toyotomi Hidenaga)

Notable people
 Yanagisawa Yoriyasu, Japanese samurai of the Edo period
 Shigeru Joshima, Japanese musician, actor and guitarist, leader and member of the rock band Tokio
 Yoshinori Fujimoto, Japanese professional golfer (Japan Golf Tour)
 Kazuyoshi Shirahama, Japanese politician, member of the New Komeito Party, and member of the House of Councillors in the Diet (national legislature)
 Yoshimoto Ishin, Japanese businessman and Buddhist monk (Jōdo Shinshū)
 Yoshiyuki Kamei, Japanese professional baseball player for the Yomiuri Giants in Japan's Nippon Professional Baseball
 Sanae Takaichi, Japanese politician, member of the Liberal Democratic Party and member of the House of Representatives

Education

High schools 
 Nara Gakuen
 Kōriyama High School
 Yamatochūō High School

Junior high schools 
 Kōriyama Junior High School
 Kōriyama-Minami Junior High School
 Kōriyama-Nishi Junior High School
 Kōriyama-Higashi Junior High School
 Katagiri Junior High School

Transportation

Rail
West Japan Railway Company
Kansai Main Line (Yamatoji Line): Kōriyama Station – Yamato-Koizumi Station
Kintetsu Railway
Kashihara Line: Kujō Station – Kintetsu-Kōriyama Station – Tsutsui Station – Hirahata Station – Family-Kōemmae Station
Tenri Line: Hirahata Station

Road
Expressways
Nishi-Meihan Expressway
Keinawa Expressway (under construction)
 National Route 24
 National Route 25
 National Route 308

Cycling

The cycling route from Nara to Asuka designated by Nara Prefecture as Route C7 runs through the city.

Sister cities
Yamatokōriyama has been twinned with Kōfu, Yamanashi, in Japan since 1992. The two cities are twinned because during the Edo period the Yanagisawa family were transferred from Kofu to Yamatokoriyama under Kunigae (国替), a policy in which daimyōs were transferred from one post to the next.

References

External links

 

 
Cities in Nara Prefecture